Deerfield Colony may refer to a Hutterite colony in the United States:

 Deerfield Colony, Montana
 Deerfield Colony, South Dakota